

Track listing
 Girlfriend (Pied Piper Remix) - 2:57
 Girlfriend (Ron G Remix Main Version) - 3:17
 Girlfriend (Big Tank Club Remix) - 3:48
 Bump That - 3:15
 Bump, Bump, Bump (with P. Diddy) - 4:51
 What a Girl Wants - 4:41
 Stuck Like This  (Jhené)  - 3:29

B2K albums
2002 remix albums
Epic Records remix albums